Anthony Battaglia may refer to:

 Anthony Battaglia (ice hockey) (born 1979), American ice hockey player
 Anthony J. Battaglia (born 1949), American federal judge